Afifella pfennigii  is a bacterial species from the genus  Afifella which has been isolated from benthic microbial mat from a brackish water pond on the Rangiroa Atoll on the French Polynesia Islands.

References

Further reading

External links 
Type strain of Afifella pfennigii at BacDive -  the Bacterial Diversity Metadatabase

Hyphomicrobiales
Bacteria described in 2009